David Lee Steen,  (born 14 November 1959) is a Canadian retired decathlete, a three-time member of the Canadian Summer Olympic Games team and the first Canadian to score more than 8,000 points in the decathlon.

He was named after his uncle, David Lorne Steen, a Canadian shot putter and gold medallist at the 1966 Commonwealth Games. His father, Don Steen, was Canadian decathlon champion in 1956.

Earlier in his career, Steen excelled in the jump events, establishing personal bests of 7.37m, 2.03m, and 14.25m in the long, high, and triple jump while attending Burnaby Central Secondary.

Steen won the decathlon gold medal at the 1977 Canada Games. Steen was named to the 1980 Canadian Olympic team, but did not compete due to the American-led boycott of the 1980 Summer Olympics. He won a silver medal at the 1982 Commonwealth Games and gold at the 1983 Pan American Games. After a disappointing eighth-place finish at the 1984 Summer Olympics, Steen won silver at the 1986 Commonwealth Games and won the bronze medal at the 1988 Summer Olympics.

In 1990, Steen was made a Member of the Order of Canada. He has been inducted into the BC Sports Hall of Fame (1991) and Canada's Sports Hall of Fame (1992).

He now resides in Tecumseh, Ontario, with his wife Andrea Conlon, who was also a Canadian Olympic athlete. Together they have four children, Kory, Jordie, Jacey and Jack. He works as a firefighter.

References
Notes

Sources

External links
 
 
 
 
 
 
 

1959 births
Living people
Sportspeople from New Westminster
Sportspeople from British Columbia
Canadian decathletes
Canadian firefighters
Olympic track and field athletes of Canada
Olympic bronze medalists for Canada
Athletes (track and field) at the 1984 Summer Olympics
Athletes (track and field) at the 1988 Summer Olympics
Medalists at the 1988 Summer Olympics
Pan American Games track and field athletes for Canada
Pan American Games gold medalists for Canada
Pan American Games medalists in athletics (track and field)
Athletes (track and field) at the 1979 Pan American Games
Athletes (track and field) at the 1983 Pan American Games
Commonwealth Games silver medallists for Canada
Commonwealth Games medallists in athletics
Athletes (track and field) at the 1982 Commonwealth Games
Athletes (track and field) at the 1986 Commonwealth Games
World Athletics Championships athletes for Canada
Members of the Order of Canada
Olympic bronze medalists in athletics (track and field)
Universiade medalists in athletics (track and field)
Universiade gold medalists for Canada
Medalists at the 1983 Summer Universiade
Medalists at the 1983 Pan American Games
Medallists at the 1982 Commonwealth Games
Medallists at the 1986 Commonwealth Games